Phoenix InfoNews Channel is a Hong Kong pay television news channel owned by Phoenix Television. It is the first channel to report news across the Greater China region, which includes mainland China, Macau, Taiwan and Hong Kong. The channel first started broadcasting on 1 January 2001, delivering news and financial updates around the clock. Analysts also provide comments and analysis on current issues and topics.

The channel's coverage of the September 11 attacks prompted China Central Television to launch its own rolling news channel) on May Day 2003. At the time when the story broke, InfoNews was on-the-scene and provided reporting as the situation unfolded, whereas CCTV did not report it for as many as two successive days.

On March 14, 2019, Phoenix InfoNews Channel switch to 16:9 format on Astro.

The Phoenix InfoNews Channel and Phoenix Chinese Channel ceased broadcasting on 1 July 2020 at 12:02am on Astro due to the latter deciding not to renew the former's contact: however, both channels later resumed broadcasts on 9 July.

Related channels
Phoenix Chinese Channel
Phoenix Chinese News and Entertainment Channel
Phoenix Movies Channel
Phoenix Hong Kong Channel

References

External links
  
 Official Site

Television stations in Taiwan
24-hour television news channels in China
Cable television in Hong Kong
Television channels and stations established in 2001
Television stations in Hong Kong
Phoenix Television original programming
Former subsidiaries of The Walt Disney Company